is a Japanese footballer who plays for V-Varen Nagasaki.

Club statistics
Updated to 2 February 2018.

References

External links
Profile at V-Varen Nagasaki

1989 births
Living people
University of Tsukuba alumni
People from Tōkai, Aichi
Association football people from Aichi Prefecture
Japanese footballers
J1 League players
J2 League players
Kashiwa Reysol players
Matsumoto Yamaga FC players
Shimizu S-Pulse players
V-Varen Nagasaki players
Association football goalkeepers